West Tamworth is a suburb of Tamworth, New South Wales, Australia, in the city's west. It is between South Tamworth and Taminda (Tamworth Industrial Area). It is an important commercial and residential area of Tamworth. In West Tamworth is the important commercial area of Bridge Street, which is one of the main roads connecting the northern  side of Tamworth with the southern. The Oxley Highway runs through part of West Tamworth.

Commercial area
Bridge Street is an important commercial area for Tamworth and many businesses serving the southern side and whole of Tamworth are located upon it. Bridge Street becomes Brisbane Street on the northern side of the Peel River, however Bridge Street is not viewed as a part of the Tamworth Central Business District> Instead, it is viewed as a separate commercial area. Tamworth Shopping World is located on Bridge Street and is a major commercial centre in Tamworth.

Clubs
West Tamworth League Club is located in West Tamworth, and is home of the West Tamworth Lions rugby league club. It is also a popular venue during the Tamworth Country Music Festival in January and artists such as John Butler Trio, The Baileys, John Williamson, Pete Murray, The Waifs, Missy Higgins, Grinspoon, Xavier Rudd and Kasey Chambers have all played at the  club.  Wests and Wests' Diggers (Kable Avenue in the CBD) are part of the Wests Entertainment Group.

Sport
The Tamworth netball courts, baseball and softball fields are located riverside on the western side of the Peel River. This area is in both West Tamworth and the industrial suburb Taminda. The Tamworth Touch fields are also located riverside in West Tamworth. The West Tamworth Lions rugby league club play at the West Tamworth Leagues Club at their fields are known as Scully Park. Former Australian representative and St. George, player Nathan Blacklock played one game for the West Lions in early 2007. The Tamworth Pirates rugby club play at grounds near the West Lions Scully Park ground, and across the road from the West and South Tamworth Scully Park Olympic Pool. This Olympic pool is council owned and many swimmers use it for training and competition.

Rivalries
There is a rich tradition of rivalries in Rugby league and Rugby Union between West Tamworth and North Tamworth as the suburbs' football teams represent the western and northern suburbs of Tamworth respectively. In rugby league this rivalry is between the West Tamworth Lions and the North Tamworth Bears, with their clash  drawing large crowds each year. In rugby union this rivalry is between the Pirates rugby club and the Tamworth Magpies, with their clash each year also drawing large crowds.

Schools

Parry School SSP (School For Specific Purpose)
Peel High School
St Josephs Catholic School
Tamworth West Public School (TWPS)

Gallery

References

Suburbs of Tamworth, New South Wales
Main North railway line, New South Wales